Lasheh may refer to:
 Lasheh, Langarud (لشه - Lasheh)
 Lasheh, Rasht (لاشه - Lāsheh)